Rupani is a small rural municipality in Saptari District in the Sagarmatha Zone of south-eastern Nepal. At the time of the 2019 Nepal census it had a population of 29,989 people living in about 8500 individual households.

Cultural Traditions 
Major religious celebrations include the major Hindu festivals Vijaya Dashami, Dipawali, Chhath, Holi, Ram Navmi, Janai Purnima or Rakshabandhan, Saraswati Puja or Vasant Panchami, Jeetia, Chauth Chandra, Vishwakarma Puja, Govardhan Puja, Bhai Tika, Chaite Dashain and so on. The  Dashain, Deepawali, Chhath and Holi are heavily celebrated with full devotee and proper rules. The locals people take pride in the way these festivals are celebrated with joy and happiness.

and Muslim festival "Eid al-Fitr" and  "Eid al-Adha"

Religious Sites 
Though its name is given after Rupani Devi. People use to visit there in huge numbers on Saturday to worship Shani Dev. Dinaram Bhadri is the deity god of Musahar people. There are many small temples including dihabar sthan, rajaji, hanuman temple, etc.

References 

Rural municipalities in Saptari District
Populated places in Saptari District
VDCs in Saptari District
Rural municipalities of Nepal established in 2017
Rural municipalities in Madhesh Province